Wallsburg is a town in Wasatch County, Utah, United States. It is part of the Salt Lake City metropolitan area. The population was 250 at the 2010 census.  Wallsburg was established in 1861, and was named for William Madison Wall.

Geography

Demographics

As of the census of 2010, there were 250 people living in the town. The racial makeup of the town was 99.6% White, and 0.4% from two or more races. Hispanic or Latino of any race were 2.4% of the population.

As of the census of 2000, there were 274 people, 83 households, and 73 families living in the town. The population density was 543.0 people per square mile (/km2). There were 93 housing units at an average density of 184.3 per square mile (/km2). The racial makeup of the town was 99.64% White and 0.36% Native American. Hispanic or Latino of any race were 0.73% of the population.

There were 83 households, out of which 45.8% had children under the age of 18 living with them, 83.1% were married couples living together, 4.8% had a female householder with no husband present, and 12.0% were non-families. 12.0% of all households were made up of individuals, and 10.8% had someone living alone who was 65 years of age or older. The average household size was 3.30 and the average family size was 3.56.

In the town, the population was spread out, with 31.0% under the age of 18, 13.1% from 18 to 24, 23.7% from 25 to 44, 20.4% from 45 to 64, and 11.7% who were 65 years of age or older. The median age was 32 years. For every 100 females, there were 106.0 males. For every 100 females age 18 and over, there were 101.1 males.

The median income for a household in the town was $55,313, and the median income for a family was $59,375. Males had a median income of $39,375 versus $21,042 for females. The per capita income for the town was $21,165. About 5.1% of families and 3.3% of the population were below the poverty line, including 1.8% of those under the age of eighteen and none of those 65 or over.

Government
Both during the 2011 and 2013 election years, the town recorder failed to open the filing period or schedule the election, so the current council and mayor were appointed to serve a 2-year-term in 2011 and another 2-year term in 2013. The current mayor of Wallsburg is Celeni Richins.

See also

 List of cities and towns in Utah

References

External links

Towns in Wasatch County, Utah
Towns in Utah
Populated places established in 1862
1862 establishments in Utah Territory